The first USS Willoughby (SP-2129) was a patrol vessel that served in the United States Navy from 1918 to 1919.
 
Willoughby was built as the wooden-hulled ferry steamer SS Augustus J. Phillips in 1903 at South Rondout, New York. Her name had been changed to SS Willoughby by the time she was chartered by the U.S. Navy from the Chesapeake Ferry Company of Portsmouth, Virginia, for local district patrol duties during World War I. She was assigned the Navy classification SP-2129 and commissioned as USS Willoughby on 8 February 1918.

Willoughby operated in the 5th Naval District for the duration of World War I and ultimately was decommissioned and returned to her pre-war owners on 26 September 1919.

Notes

References

External links

Patrol vessels of the United States Navy
World War I patrol vessels of the United States
Ships built in New York (state)
1903 ships